Ho King Commercial Building and Ho King Shopping Centre are located at the junction of Fa Yuen Street and Dundas Street in Mong Kok, Hong Kong. Built in the 1980s, the lower levels of the shopping centre mainly sold video games and video game consoles in the early days. Gangsters later came in and began selling pornographic and unlicensed copies of VCDs that have made the shopping centre famous.

Slogans that their promoters yelled became alternative culture. The Hong Kong Government attempts to clear out merchants selling illegal goods frequently. In 2005, the 2nd floor was renovated as a pop culture market for youth.

References

Transport
Yau Ma Tei station Exit A2

External links
 

Mong Kok
Shopping centres in Hong Kong